Teh Chai Ann is a Malaysian politician who has served as the Perlis State Executive Councillor and Member of the Perlis State Legislative Assembly (MLA) for Titi Tinggi from May 2018 to November 2022. He is a member and one of the two MLAs from the Malaysian Chinese Association (MCA), a component party of the ruling Barisan Nasional (BN) coalition. He was also the sole Chinese and MCA Perlis State Executive Councillor as well as sole MCA MLA of Perlis.

Election results

References

Living people
People from Perlis
Malaysian people of Hokkien descent
Malaysian people of Chinese descent
Malaysian Chinese Association politicians
Members of the Perlis State Legislative Assembly
Perlis state executive councillors
21st-century Malaysian politicians
Year of birth missing (living people)